Another Broken Heart

"Another Broken Heart", song by Nudimension from The Best of Nudimension
"Another Broken Heart", song by Los Lonely Boys Forgiven (album), 2008
"Another Broken Heart", song by Esera Tuaolo
"Another Broken Heart", song by O'Chi Brown from Learning to Live (Without Your Love), 1986
"Another Broken Heart", song by Graham Nash from This Path Tonight, 2016
"Another Broken Heart", song by Tove Styrke from Hard, 2022